Paulsdale is a historic estate and house museum in Mount Laurel Township, New Jersey.  Built about 1840, it was the birthplace and childhood home of Alice Paul (1885-1977), a major leader in the Women's suffrage movement in the United States, whose activism led to passage of the Nineteenth Amendment to the United States Constitution, granting women the right to vote.  It was added to the National Register of Historic Places on July 5, 1989, for its significance in social history and politics/government.  Paulsdale was designated a National Historic Landmark in 1991.

History
The main house at Paulsdale was built about 1800 by Benjamin Hooton.  The Paul family purchased the  farm around 1883.  The property remained in the Paul family until 1958, and served as a sort of "home base" for activist Alice Paul, who was born here in 1885.  For much of her adult life she lived an itinerant lifestyle, driven by her activism for women's suffrage.  Paulsdale was a place she regularly returned to, holding meetings and strategy sessions for her campaigns.  It was sold out of the family in 1958, after her brother's death.

During the 1950s, the property was divided into two parcels:  of farmland and the remaining  which included the house and farm buildings.  The larger became a housing development, while the smaller remained a private residence until it was purchased by the Alice Paul Institute in 1990.

The house has been restored to the condition when Alice Paul lived there. It now serves as a historic house museum and a home for the institute. The purpose of the institute is to make sure Alice Paul's legacy survives by enhancing the knowledge of future generations on the topic of human rights.

See also 
 List of monuments and memorials to women's suffrage
 Barbara Haney Irvine, who led the campaign to purchase Paulsdale through the Alice Paul Institute
 List of National Historic Landmarks in New Jersey

References

External links 
 Official site

Houses in Burlington County, New Jersey
National Historic Landmarks in New Jersey
Historic house museums in New Jersey
Biographical museums in New Jersey
Museums in Burlington County, New Jersey
Women's museums in the United States
Mount Laurel, New Jersey
National Register of Historic Places in Burlington County, New Jersey
New Jersey Register of Historic Places
Alice Paul
Birthplaces of individual people